The Cayman Airline Pilots Association (CAPA) is a trade union in the Cayman Islands.

See also
 List of trade unions

External links
 Caribbean Airline Pilots Association
 International Federation of Air Line Pilots' Associations

International Federation of Air Line Pilots' Associations
Airline pilots' trade unions
Trade unions in the Cayman Islands